The Bibeksheel Sajha Party (Nepali: विवेकशील साझा पार्टी) is a political party in Nepal. It was the sixth largest party of Nepal by popular vote after 2017 Nepalese general election. Presently, its the fifth largest party in Bagmati provincial assembly.

Background 
It was originally founded on 26 July 2017 from the merger of Sajha Party and Bibeksheel Nepal Dal, but the party split on 11 January 2019.

The two parties merged for a second time on 9 December 2020.

Recently, Bibeksheel Sajha Party has adopted Rabindra Mishra's document 'Changing Course: Nation Above Notion' that proposes abolition of federalism and a plebiscite on secularism. Mishra has been provide the role of chief executive to the party president concluding that granting equal rights to the president and the coordinator led to difficulties in running the party. The document was passed by two third majority of central committee.

History 

On 26 July 2017 it was announced that Sajha Party would merge with Bibeksheel Nepali Dal to form Bibeksheel Sajha Party. The new party would be led under the joint leadership of Rabindra Mishra and Ujwal Bahadur Thapa. The party adopted scales as their electoral symbol.

In the 2017 legislative elections, the party contested 60 seats but won none. Party founder and leader Rabindra Mishra lost in Kathmandu to Nepali Congress leader Prakash Man Singh by a margin of just 818 votes. The party won 212,336 votes under proportional representation and finished with the sixth highest number of votes in the country. They were unable to cross the three percent threshold to gain seats in the House of Representatives. The party also did not win any seats in the 2017 provincial election under first past the post but won three seats to the Provincial Assembly of Province No. 3 under proportional representation after finishing with the fourth highest number of votes with 124,442 votes. The party decided to support Nepali Congress candidate Radhe Shyam Adhikari in the National Assembly elections on 6 February 2018. Bibeksheel Sajha Party, along with Naya Shakti Party, abstained from voting in the 2018 presidential and vice-presidential elections.

Split and reformation 
The party split on 11 January 2019 when party co-coordinator Ujwal Bahadur Thapa, along with 16 central committee members filed an application to register his old party, Bibeksheel Nepali Dal at the Election Commission.

The two parties announced on 20 October 2020 that they were in talks for reunification. The two parties officially announced their reunification on 9 December 2020, twenty-three months after their split. It was also announced that Sajha Party leader Rabindra Mishra would serve as chairman of the new party and Bibeksheel Nepali chairman Milan Pandey would be the co-ordinator.

However, 13 central committee members including vice-chair Ajeeta Rai and office management secretary Sangita Bataju who had opposed the second unification decided not to go with the merge. The group later formed Nepal Bibeksheel Party under the leadership of Karma Tamang.

Electoral performance

Local election

Leadership

Party presidents 

 Samikchya Baskota, -- 2079/10/28- present

Spokesperson 

 Prakash Chandra Pariyar, 2079- present

Presence in provincial assemblies

See also 
Bibeksheel Sajha Yuva Sangathan
 Sajha Party
 Bibeksheel Nepali Dal

References 

Political parties in Nepal
Political parties established in 2017
2017 establishments in Nepal